Meredith Gentry may refer to:
 Merry Gentry (series), a series of books by Laurell K. Hamilton where this is the pseudonym of central character Meredith NicEssus
Merry Gentry, the main character in the series
 Meredith Poindexter Gentry (1809–1866), U.S. politician